Longueira / Almograve is a Portuguese parish in the municipality of Odemira. As of 2021, the parish has an estimated 2,338 inhabitants in an area of 91.69 km2. With the 2021 census, Longueira / Almograve became the highest growing civil parish in Portugal, with an additional 72.4% from 2011. It was created on June 12, 2001, from the parish of São Salvador.

References

Freguesias of Odemira